Panama is a 2015 Serbian drama film directed by Pavle Vučković. It has been selected to screen in the Special Screenings section at the 2015 Cannes Film Festival.

Cast
 Slaven Doslo as Jovan
 Jovana Stojiljković as Maja
 Biljana Mišić as Sanja
 Jelisaveta Orašanin as Milica
 Nebojša Milovanović as Professor
 Tamara Dragičević as Sandra
 Miloš Pjevač as Milan

References

External links
 

2015 films
2015 drama films
Serbian drama films
2010s Serbian-language films
Films set in Serbia
Films shot in Belgrade